Ion Pop (8 May 1947 – 8 December 2015) was a Romanian footballer who played as a right defender. After he retired from playing football he worked for almost 30 years at Rapid București, mainly at the team's youth center where he taught and formed generations of players, which include Nicolae Stanciu and Nicolae Grigore. His nephew, Mihai Iosif was also a footballer who played at Rapid București.

International career

Ion Pop played two friendly games for Romania, making his debut under coach Gheorghe Ola in a 4–2 away victory against Morocco. His second game for the national team was a 2–2 against Peru and he also appeared once for Romania's Olympic team in a 3–2 loss against Denmark at the 1972 Summer Olympics qualifiers.

Honours

Player

Rapid Bucureşti
Divizia B: 1974–75
Cupa României: 1971–72, 1974–75, runner-up 1967–68

Manager

Rapid Bucureşti
Divizia B: 1989–90

Notes

References

External links

Ion Pop manager profile at Labtof.ro

1947 births
2015 deaths
Romanian footballers
Romania international footballers
Association football defenders
Liga I players
Liga II players
FC Petrolul Ploiești players
FC Argeș Pitești players
FC Rapid București players
Romanian football managers
FC Rapid București managers
Footballers from Bucharest